Linnea Johnson (born 1946 Chicago) is an American poet, and feminist writer, winner of the inaugural Beatrice Hawley Award for The Chicago Home (Alice James Books, 1986). Johnson was raised in Chicago, and lives and writes in Topeka, Kansas. She earned a B.A. and a Ph.D. from the University of Nebraska–Lincoln, and an M.A. in writing and women's studies from Goddard College. She has hosted radio shows on WGLT-FM (Normal, Illinois) and on KRNU (Lincoln, NE). Among her performance pieces are Swedish Christmas and a multi-media piece, Crazy Song. She studied papermaking at Carriage House Paper in Boston, and is founder and director of Red Stuga Studio and Espelunda 3 Productions, a Writing, Creativity, and Mentoring Consultancy also offering classes in creativity, poetry, prose, and play writing; Play, CD, and Staged Reading Productions. Her photographs can be found in Blatant Image, Nebraska Review, Prairie Schooner, Spoon River Poetry Journal.

Her poems have been published in literary journals and magazines including The American Poetry Review, Beloit Poetry Review, Cimarron Review, Ekphrasis, Luna, North American Review, Prairie Schooner, Red Hawk Review, Spoon River Poetry Review, The Antioch Review, Black, Warrior Review, Mother Earth News, and Rain and Thunder.

Adrienne Rich has praised her poems as, "strong and ardent and credible, full of wisdom and indignation. They tell stories we need to hear, sung with the pounding verve of the blood behind them."

Published works
Full-length Poetry Collections
 
 

Anthology Publications

References

External links
 Author Bio > Linnea Johnson > Nebraska Center for Writers
 Author Page > Linnea Johnson > Alice James Books
 Poem: Author Page > Linnea Johnson > Alice James Books
 Poem: 
 Short Story: The Antioch Review > January 1, 2003 > Forty Acres and a Pool by Linnea Johnson

1946 births
Living people
University of Nebraska–Lincoln alumni
Goddard College alumni
Writers from Chicago
Poets from Illinois
American women poets
21st-century American women